The Unloved Woman (Spanish:La malquerida) is a 1914 Spanish silent film directed by Ricardo de Baños. It is based on Jacinto Benavente's 1913 play of the same title.

Cast
 Antonia Arévalo 
 Francisco Fuentes hijo 
 Francisco Fuentes 
 Carmen Muñoz Gar

References

Bibliography
 Bentley, Bernard. A Companion to Spanish Cinema. Boydell & Brewer 2008.

External links 

1914 films
1914 drama films
Spanish drama films
Spanish silent films
1910s Spanish-language films
Spanish black-and-white films
Silent drama films